Mariano "Anno" Rosario Nalupta Jr. (April 26, 1945 - September 2, 2014), was a Filipino lawyer and politician. He was Congressman of the 2nd District of Ilocos Norte from 1987 to 1992. He later served as Vice Governor of Ilocos Norte from 1992 to 2001.

He died on September 2, 2014 at the Philippine Heart Center after suffering a heart attack.

Early life
Nalupta was born on April 26, 1945 at Batac, Ilocos Norte to Mariano Nalupta Sr., his namesake and who was then the Mayor of Batac, and Trinidad Rosario. His brother Jesus served as Mayor of Batac from 1988 to 1998 and 2001 to 2007.

Political career

He served as Councilor of Batac from 1976 to 1980. He later served as a Board Member of the 2nd District of Ilocos Norte from 1980 to 1986. In 1987, he was elected as Congressman of the 2nd District of Ilocos Norte and served until 1992. He was later elected as Vice Governor of Ilocos Norte in 1992 and served until 2001.

After his term as Vice Governor, he was elected as the President of the Integrated Bar of the Philippines - Ilocos Norte Chapter.

In 2004, he ran again for Vice Governor of Ilocos Norte but was unsuccessful.

He ran again as representative of the 2nd District of Ilocos Norte in 2010 but lost to Former First Lady Imelda R. Marcos.

Personal life

He was married to Ma. Elena Marders - Nalupta, a former Vice Mayor (1995 - 1998) and Mayor of Batac (1998 - 2001) and former Provincial Board Member of the 2nd District of Ilocos Norte (2004 - 2013). They have four children namely;

 Ronald Allan M. Nalupta, former Vice Mayor (2007 - 2016) and Councilor of Batac (1998 - 2007) He ran for Mayor of Batac in the 2016 elections but lost to Engr. Albert D. Chua.
 Judge Myra Shiela M. Nalupta - Barba, presiding MTC Branch 1 Judge of Laoag. Married to Ilocos Norte Vice Governor Angelo Marcos Barba.
 Atty. Richard Alvin M. Nalupta, former National Youth Commission President under the Arroyo Administration. Former SK Federated President of Ilocos Norte.
 Mariano Francisco M. Nalupta III, incumbent Barangay Chairman of Brgy. 2 Ablan, Batac.

Death
Nalupta died on September 2, 2014, around 6am, at the Philippine Heart Center in Quezon City. His remains were brought to Ilocos Norte. His official wake was held in their family residence at Brgy. 4 Nalupta, Batac. On the last day of his wake, September 12, 2014, his remains were brought to the Batac City Hall.

His funeral was held on September 13, 2014 with a funeral mass held at the Immaculate Conception Parish. After the mass, he was finally buried at the Nalupta Family Mausoleum, Aglipay Cemetery, in Batac.

Funeral accident
After the funeral mass held for Nalupta Jr. at the Immaculate Conception Parish on September 13, 2014, the funeral cortege was on the way to the final resting place of the late public servant when a SUV (Mitsubishi Montero), owned by one of the children of the deceased, suddenly went out of control in front of the church, hitting 13 people, including Provincial Board Member Ria Christina Fariñas, daughter of Congressman Rodolfo Fariñas, former Vigan City Councilor Janina Medina-Fariñas, and Batac ABC President Johann Nalupta, nephew of the deceased. Two victims died in the said accident; Teresa Domingo, 72 and Elston Franco, 70.

References

See also
 Jesus Nalupta Sr., brother

|-

|-

1945 births
2014 deaths
20th-century Filipino lawyers
Lakas–CMD politicians
People from Batac
Members of the House of Representatives of the Philippines from Ilocos Norte
Filipino city and municipal councilors